Zofia Kuratowska (20 July 1931 – 8 June 1999) was a Polish doctor, politician, and diplomat of Jewish descent. Her father, Kazimierz Kuratowski, was a mathematician who worked at the Warsaw School of Mathematics. Kuratowska took part in the Warsaw Uprising during World War II. After the war ended, she graduated from the Medical University of Warsaw with a specialty in hematology, and became a doctor. In the 1980s she joined the Solidarity movement and became one of their healthcare workers.

During her time in Solidarity, she took care of over 1,000 political prisoners, and published underground magazines emphasizing their lack of care and inadequate living conditions. During the HIV/AIDS epidemic throughout the 1980s, the government turned to Kuratowska, working with her to prevent the spread of the virus despite having blacklisted her earlier in the decade due to her Solidarity activism. In 1989, she took part in the Polish Round Table Agreement, and from there ran for the Senate in the first democratic elections. She won with 82.5 percent of the vote, the largest margin of any candidate, which she accomplished by saying that she "could not promise anything." In her first term, she was chosen to be Deputy Marshal of the Senate. During this time, she also ran the Hematology Clinic at the Warsaw School of Medicine.

Kuratowska was re-elected to the Senate in 1991 in 1993, serving as Deputy Marshal again during her third term. She served on the Committee on Social Affairs and Health and the Foreign Affairs Committee. After her term ended in 1997, she was nominated to be the ambassador to South Africa, where she spent the rest of her life, dying in 1999.

Honours 

 Knight's Cross of the Order of Polonia Restituta (1987)
 Commander's Cross of the Order of Polonia Restituta (1990)
 Commander's Cross with Star of the Order of Polonia Restituta (1997)

References

1931 births
1999 deaths
People from Piaseczno County
People from Warsaw Voivodeship (1919–1939)
20th-century Polish Jews
Democratic Union (Poland) politicians
Freedom Union (Poland) politicians
Members of the Senate of Poland 1989–1991
Members of the Senate of Poland 1991–1993
Members of the Senate of Poland 1993–1997
Women members of the Senate of Poland
Ambassadors of Poland to South Africa
Polish women ambassadors
Polish Round Table Talks participants
Polish hematologists
20th-century Polish physicians
Medical University of Warsaw alumni
Academic staff of the Medical University of Warsaw
Commanders of the Order of Polonia Restituta
Commanders with Star of the Order of Polonia Restituta
Knights of the Order of Polonia Restituta
Burials at Powązki Military Cemetery
20th-century Polish women